Mark S. Goodacre (born 1967 in Leicestershire, England) is a New Testament scholar and Professor at Duke University's Department of Religion. He has written extensively on the Synoptic Problem; that is, the origins of the gospels of Matthew, Mark, and Luke. He has defended the Farrer hypothesis, and thus accepts Markan priority but rejects Q.

Goodacre earned his M.A., M.Phil. and D.Phil. at the University of Oxford and was Senior Lecturer at the Department of Theology and Religion at the University of Birmingham until 2005.

He has also been a consultant for numerous television and radio shows related to the New Testament, such as the 2001 BBC series Son of God and the 2013 mini-series The Bible.

Works

References

External links
 Goodacre's portal on the New Testament
 Goodacre's homepage
 Weblog relating to his field of study
 Personal weblog

New Testament scholars
Synoptic problem
Duke University faculty
Living people
People from Leicestershire
British biblical scholars
Alumni of the University of Oxford
1967 births
Academics of the University of Birmingham